Jayden Peevy (born September 3, 1999) is an American football defensive end for the Tennessee Titans of the National Football League (NFL).

Early life and education
Peevy was born on September 3, 1999, in Bellaire, Texas. He attended Bellaire High School and played football, recording 77 tackles and 10 sacks as a senior while being named U.S. Army All-American. He was a four-star recruit and was ranked the fifth-best defensive end in Texas, the ninth-best strongside defensive end nationally, and the 34th-best in the state. Peevy initially committed to play college football at Baylor, but switched to Texas A&M after the firing of Baylor's coach.

As a true freshman in 2017, Peevy appeared in 12 games for Texas A&M and posted 17 tackles as well as one sack. The following year, he appeared in all 13 games and recorded nine tackles. He also blocked two field goals, both of which came in the same game (versus UAB). As a junior in 2019, Peevy played 12 games, three of which he started, and tallied 34 tackles with 1.5 sacks.

Peevy became a full-time starter in 2020, starting all 10 games in a season shortened by COVID-19 and again making 34 tackles, although he appeared in two less games than the prior year. He also recorded one sack. Peevy opted to return to the team in 2021 after being given one extra year of eligibility. He posted 43 tackles and two sacks, and was invited to the NFLPA Collegiate Bowl. After a game against Colorado, he was named conference defensive lineman of the week. At the team banquet at the end of the year, Peevy was given Texas A&M's "Mr. Dependable" Award. He finished his college career with 58 games played, 137 total tackles and 7.5 sacks.

Professional career
After going unselected in the 2022 NFL Draft, Peevy was signed by the Tennessee Titans as an undrafted free agent. He was released at the final roster cuts, and afterwards was re-signed to the practice squad. Peevy was elevated to the active roster for the Titans' Week 17 game with the Dallas Cowboys, and made his NFL debut in the loss, appearing on 27 defensive snaps. He signed a reserve/future contract on January 10, 2023.

References

External links
Tennessee Titans bio
Texas A&M Aggies bio

Further reading

1999 births
Living people
American football defensive tackles
American football defensive ends
People from Bellaire, Texas
Players of American football from Texas
Texas A&M Aggies football players
Tennessee Titans players